Nuneaton Abbey Street was the second main railway station serving Nuneaton in Warwickshire, England, It operated between 1864 and closure in 1968. The other main station being Nuneaton Trent Valley which is still open, but now known as simply Nuneaton. The station served the Birmingham-Nuneaton-Leicester Line and also the now closed Ashby and Nuneaton Joint Railway.

It was originally opened on 1 December 1864 by the Midland Railway on their line from Birmingham to Nuneaton. The station was rebuilt on a slightly different location in 1873, when the Ashby and Nuneaton Joint Railway was opened. The station was designed by the Midland Railway company architect John Holloway Sanders.

Until 2 June 1924 it was known as Nuneaton Midland. It was renamed as Nuneaton Abbey Street to avoid confusion with Trent Valley station, when the Midland Railway and the London and North Western Railway were grouped to create the London, Midland and Scottish Railway (LMS). The station came under the control of British Railways in 1948.

The station was closed on 4 March 1968, and all services were diverted through Trent Valley station. Today, trains still run past the site of the station on the Birmingham-Leicester-Peterborough Line, but little physical trace of the station remains, as the platforms and most of the station buildings have been removed. In 2018 the only remaining remnant of the station was a former waiting room, now within a private garden.

References
 Nuneaton Abbey Street station on Warwickshirerailways.com

Disused railway stations in Warwickshire
Former Midland Railway stations
Railway stations in Great Britain opened in 1864
Railway stations in Great Britain closed in 1873
Railway stations in Great Britain opened in 1873
Railway stations in Great Britain closed in 1968
Beeching closures in England
John Holloway Sanders railway stations